"Brick by Boring Brick" is a song by American rock band Paramore. The song was released in late 2009 as the second single from their third studio album, Brand New Eyes (2009).

"Brick by Boring Brick" was also featured in The Vampire Diaries episode "Under Control" that aired on April 15, 2010.  In terms of airplay, it is one of the album's successful singles, including the song "The Only Exception".

Reception
The song received generally positive reviews from critics. Alex Fletcher of Digital Spy, who gave the song 4 stars out of 5. He said the song is "infectious, deliciously dark ('Well go get your shovel, and we'll dig a deep hole'), and packed with more energy than a Jedward dance routine – Williams sounds downright tremendous leading the 'ba-ba-ba' climax – this should provide a welcome edge at the top end of the charts". Rolling Stone stated that "Brick by Boring Brick" was able to "weave unexpected Smashing Pumpkins-style sonics into the mix." The song received a positive review from Vicki Lutas of the BBC, who awarded the song 5 out of 5 stars. She said that the song is "hair-raisingly BRILLIANT" and said "Listening to the lyrics is like entering a world where sandcastles aren't built, but buried, a world where the baddie is not the wolf, but reality... and in this world, things are dark, but they're very real. There's a sense of longing; longing for those fairy tales and longing for innocence, but it's coupled with a sense of realization that this will never happen."

Music video
The music video for "Brick by Boring Brick" was filmed in Los Angeles on October 8, 2009. It was directed by Meiert Avis and produced by Jeremy Alter. The video depicts a young girl (Harley Graham) with butterfly wings exploring a surreal landscape, while Hayley sings the song near a large ditch which guitarist Josh Farro is digging. Eventually the little girl's fantasy world becomes dark and frightening, with the characters she was friends with before now turning into dark and sinister creatures. She runs to escape, picking up her doll, emerging into the sunlight and falls into the ditch by where Hayley is singing. Hayley stands up and tosses the girl's doll in after her, and Josh throws the first shovelful of earth into the ditch and continues doing so as Hayley walks away. 

As of January 2023, the song has over 138 million views on YouTube.

In an interview with MTV, bassist Jeremy Davis explained that the band had created a treatment for the video before receiving further ideas from several directors. The video is Paramore's first to not be performance based and some of the members of the band are only seen for a short period of time. It is their first video to be filmed in front of green screen, and to have "a whole story behind it", with acting. Guitarist Josh Farro likened the video to the 2006 Spanish fantasy film Pan's Labyrinth. It was originally set to premiere on November 17 on The Hills, but was later postponed. The video was eventually released on Paramore.net on November 23.

Live performances
The track has been performed by Paramore on many occasions. The band's first performance of the song was in July 2009. Paramore performed a live version of "Brick By Boring Brick" for MTV Unplugged. It was also performed at the Ulalume Festival.

The song was performed as the last song on the band's Fall tour in October to December 2009. At the end of the song, the support groups would join the band on stage.

The band performed the song on Late Night with Jimmy Fallon on April 29, 2010.

Track listing

Charts

Certifications

References

2009 singles
2009 songs
Fueled by Ramen singles
Music videos directed by Meiert Avis
Paramore songs
Song recordings produced by Rob Cavallo
Songs written by Hayley Williams
Songs written by Josh Farro